The LeFevres, or The Singing LeFevres, were an American Southern gospel singing group, active for nearly 50 years in the middle of the twentieth century.

The LeFevres were a family from Smithville, Tennessee, and their singing group centered on brothers Urias (1910–1979) and Alphus (1912–1988). As children, they sang with their sister Maude until she married, then their sister Omega (Peggy) until she married; their career as an ensemble began in 1921. Both sang in quartets at the Bible Training School in Cleveland, Tennessee. Urias and Eva Mae Whittington (1917–2009) married in 1934; she became the pianist and alto in their newly formed trio.

They moved to Charleston, South Carolina, in 1937 and then Atlanta in 1939, where they would remain for the rest of their professional career, aside from a short stint in Philadelphia in the middle of the 1950s. They won slots performing on WGST radio as The LeFevre Trio, but as they added other family members and accompanists, they decided to refer to themselves simply as The LeFevres.

Though they had previously recorded transcription discs, their first commercial recordings were made in the 1940s and released on Bibletone Records. Later releases were issued on Word Records and their own label, Sing Music Company. As the new medium of television became more popular, the group started appearing on local stations such as WAGA and traveled to other regional stations to appear on their programs as well. In the 1960s, the group's Gospel Singing Caravan, a syndicated program, was aired nationwide. In addition to this, the group toured relentlessly in the U.S. and Canada, notching as many as 250 shows a year.

The LeFevres became instrumental in the gospel music industry in Atlanta, Georgia; they owned and operated their own recording studio, LeFevre Sound and also published sheet music for the gospel market. Additionally, they produced syndicated television shows for gospel and country music singers, and owned a booking agency that operated regionally.

The LeFevres retired in the 1970s, and sold off their interests to group member Rex Nelon who formed the Rex Nelon Singers in 1977. Eva Mae and Urias LeFevre were inducted into the Southern Gospel Music Hall of Fame in 1997; Alphus was inducted in 2002. Urias's youngest son, Mylon, went on to have a highly successful solo career. Popular LeFevre alumni including Big Jim Waits, Rex Nelon, and Jimmy Jones were inducted into the Southern Gospel Music Hall of Fame in 1997, 1999, and 2007, respectively.

Eva Mae LeFevre died on May 18, 2009 in Atlanta, at the age of 91.

Discography

 1957: Songs of Happiness (Sing Records)
 1959: Sing and Be Happy (Sing Records)
 1959: Featuring Pierce LeFevre (Sing Records)
 1960: Travel with the Lefevres (Sing Records)
 1960: The LeFevres in Stereo (Sing Records)
 1961: Rainbow of Love (Sing Records)
 1962: He's Wonderful (Sing Records)
 1963: The Lefevres Sing (Sing Records)
 1964: Without Him (Sing Records)
 1964: Lord It's Me Again (Sing Records)
 1965: Sing the Gospel (Sing Records)
 1966: You Need the Lord (Sing Records)
 1967: A Visit with the LeFevres (Sing Records)
 1968: A Man Who Is Wise (Sing Records)
 1969: The Best is Yet to Come (Canaan Records)
 1969: Play Gospel Music (Canaan Records)
 1969: Color Him Father and 'Amen, Brother' (released on the Metromedia imprint)
 1970: Moving Up (Canaan Records)
 1970: The LeFevres, Vol. 1 & 2 (Bibletone)
 1970: Pierce & Mylon (Canaan)
 1971: Fifty Golden Years (Canaan)
 1972: The New Sounds of The LeFevres (Canaan Records)
 1972: Now and Always (Canaan Records)
 1972: The Best of the LeFevres (Sing Records)
 1973: Happiness Is Gospel (Canaan Records)
 1974: Stepping on the Clouds (Canaan Records)
 1975: Experience (Canaan Records)
 1975: The LeFevres (Power Pak) (compilation)
 1976: Gospel Music USA (Canaan Records)
 1976: Whispering Hope (Pickwick)
 1977: Singing 'Til He Comes (Canaan Records)
 1977: 16 All-Time Favorites (Starday Records)
 1983: Come into the Light (Calvary)
 1985: The Old Rugged Cross (Golden Circle Records)
 2000: Echoes From the Forties (Bibletone Records)

References

External links
 The LeFevres, Georgia Encyclopedia.
 The LeFevres, Southern Gospel Music Association.
 Urias LeFevre, SGMA
 Alphus LeFever, SGMA
 http://www.sghistory.com/index.php?n=L.LeFevres

1921 establishments in Tennessee
Family musical groups
Musical groups established in 1921
Musical groups from Georgia (U.S. state)
Musical groups from Tennessee
Southern gospel performers
People from Smithville, Tennessee